David J. Marks is a woodworker living in Santa Rosa, California.

Marks studied art at Cabrillo College in Santa Cruz, California. In 1981, he opened a studio in Santa Rosa with his cat Liz and his young daughter. Through the 1980s, his focus was on one-of-a-kind furniture. Beginning in the 90s, he has moved toward wood turning and sculpture.

He was the host of DIY Network's show Wood Works, a show highlighting a combination of techniques using both hand and power tools to design and build pieces which feature the use of exotic woods in ways that feature their color and grain. He also incorporates metal and metal patination in the projects. Marks also used a process called bent wood lamination a process in which very many pieces of thin wooden slats are glued together and forced into a bending form to cure.  He also is a master woodturner but is drawn to furniture making and the turning side of him rarely comes out in his shows. Regardless his unique style makes for an interesting show. About his style Marks says:

"My work expresses a sense of time and mystery. My inspiration is derived from a fusion of styles including ancient Egyptian, African, Art Nouveau, Art Deco and Asian. But essential to all my designs is the attention I pay to fine details." 

Many times on the air he said that what sets fine furniture above mediocre furniture is attention to detail, such as watching the grain when joining two pieces to make it seem as if carved from a solid block of wood.  

The show ran for seven seasons and is no longer in production. As of 2007, Marks teaches private classes on various topics in his studio and while on tour.

Awards
NICHE Awards Winner - Mixed and Miscellaneous Media ~ Philadelphia, PA 2001
NICHE Awards Winner - Garden Art/Sculpture ~ Philadelphia, PA 2001
Modern Masters, Home & Garden Television Network 2000
Collaborators, with Ron Kent, an exhibit of one-of-a-kind pieces, del Mano Gallery ~ Los Angeles CA 2000
California Discovery Awards, Gold Award ~ Napa CA 1994
"Best in Show," Artistry in Wood ~ Sonoma County Woodworkers Association 1987, 1988, 1991
"Best Craftsmanship," Artistry in Wood ~ Sonoma County Woodworkers Association 1987
"Jurors Award of Excellence," Artistry in Wood ~ Sonoma County Woodworkers Association 1985
"Guild Member Award" (Best Small Piece) ~ Sonoma County Woodworkers Association, Santa Rosa CA 1983
"Jurors Award of Excellence" ~ Mendocino Woodworkers Association, Mendocino CA 1983

References

External links
Official site

Year of birth missing (living people)
Living people
American woodworkers
Cabrillo College alumni